The 20th Infantry Division (20-ya Pekhotnaya Diviziya) was an infantry formation of the Russian Imperial Army.

Organization
1st Brigade
77th Infantry Regiment
78th Infantry Regiment
2nd Brigade
79th Infantry Regiment
80th Infantry Regiment
20th Artillery Brigade

Artillery Brigade Commanders
1899-1904: Vladimir Nikolayevich Nikitin

References

Infantry divisions of the Russian Empire
Military units and formations disestablished in 1918